Saduyeh (also Romanized as Sa‘dūyeh; also known as Sa‘doo) is a village in Chahak Rural District, in the Central District of Khatam County, Yazd Province, Iran. At the 2006 census, its population was 20, in 7 families.

References 

Populated places in Khatam County